Rush TV is a primetime show aired on Studio 23 from August 2007 to 2008. It is basically a variety show, the main difference perhaps is that half the show is packed with segments made by students from the top universities and colleges in and around Metro Manila.

Synopsis
The first step was to go to all the universities and colleges and look for students who wanted to shake things up. Once they are found, those students, are brought together for a gruelling barrage of gimmicks, parties, get-togethers, training sessions and workshops.  Then milked these students for topics and subjects that interested them.  The next part was to shoot segments, and the various Student Teams shot these segments and assembled them.  Now, all that remains is to stage a huge party in some school and call it a shoot, to round off the rest of the episode.

Hosts
Mico Aytona
Say Alonzo
Roxanne Barcelo
Joaqui Mendoza
Dino Imperial
Bianca Manalo
Sam YG
Kamae de Jesus

Participating schools
The member campuses are as follows:

Asia Pacific College
Ateneo de Manila University
Colegio de San Juan de Letran
De La Salle University
De La Salle-College of Saint Benilde
Far Eastern University
National University (Philippines)
Polytechnic University of the Philippines
Technological University of the Philippines-Manila
University of Asia and the Pacific
University of Santo Tomas
University of the Philippines Diliman

See also
List of programs aired by Studio 23
Studio 23

References

External links
 Official Site

Philippine variety television shows
Studio 23 original programming
Filipino-language television shows
2007 Philippine television series debuts
2008 Philippine television series endings